Mu Piscium (μ Piscium) is a solitary, orange-hued star in the zodiac constellation of Pisces. It is visible to the naked eye with an apparent visual magnitude of 4.84.  Based upon an annual parallax shift of 10.73 mas as seen from Earth, it is located about 304 light years from the Sun. Given this distance, it has a relatively high proper motion, advancing 296 mas per year across the sky.

This is an evolved K-type giant star with a stellar classification of K4 III. It has an estimated 1.25 times the mass of the Sun and, at the age of 5.6 billion years, has expanded to about 37 times the Sun's radius. From this enlarged photosphere, it is radiating 186 times the Sun's luminosity at an effective temperature of 4,126 K. It has a magnitude 12.02 visual companion at an angular separation of 209.30 arc seconds along a position angle of 298°, as of 2012.

Naming

References

K-type giants
Pisces (constellation)
Piscium, Mu
Durchmusterung objects
Piscium, 098
009138
007007
0434